The Panic Hand is a collection of horror stories by the American writer Jonathan Carroll, first published in 1995. Carroll has written 8 novels prior to this collection, including The Land of Laughs and A Child Across the Sky. The US edition includes the novella Black Cocktail, originally published as a standalone work.

References

Novels by Jonathan Carroll
1995 short story collections
Horror short story collections
HarperCollins books